Karl Larsen is an American photographer.

Karl Larsen may also refer to:
Karl Hess Larsen (1900–1966), Norwegian lawyer and politician
Karl Alfred Larsen (wrestler) (1905–1982), Norwegian sport wrestler
Karl Larsen, character in Secret Agent of Japan

See also
Karl Larsson (disambiguation)
Carl Larson (disambiguation)
Carl Larsen (disambiguation)
Carl Larsson (1853–1919), Swedish painter and decorator
Kyle Larson (disambiguation)